Franklin United is a football club based in Drury, New Zealand. They currently play in the NRFL Northern Conference.

History
The club were formed in 2016 after a merger between Pukekohe AFC and Waiuku. In 2021, Franklin finished 4th, just missing out on promotion.

The club has competed in the Chatham Cup five times first competing in 2016, with their best appearance being in 2017 and 2019 where they reached the fourth round. In 2017 they were knocked out by Melville United losing 7–1, and in 2019 they lost 8–0 to Eastern Suburbs, making it their worst defeat in the competition.

Franklin also have a women's team who compete in the NRF Championship, after gaining promotion in 2021.

References

External links
Club website

Association football clubs in Auckland
2016 establishments in New Zealand
Association football clubs established in 2016